This is a list of Canadian Football League regular season records that are effective as of the end of the 2022 CFL season.

Italics indicate an active player.

Games
Most Games
408 - Lui Passaglia
394 - Bob Cameron
370 - Damon Allen
340 - Paul McCallum
329 - Anthony Calvillo
321 - Miles Gorrell
304 - Paul Osbaldiston
298 - Danny McManus
293 - Troy Westwood
288 - Ron Lancaster
288 - Leo Groenewegen

Most Consecutive Games
353 - Bob Cameron
279 - Troy Westwood
272 - Mark McLoughlin
268 - Roger Aldag
268 - Paul Osbaldiston

Most Regular Seasons Played
25 - Lui Passaglia
24 - Paul McCallum
23 - Bob Cameron
23 - Damon Allen
22 - Eddie Emerson
20 - Hank Ilesic
20 - Anthony Calvillo
19 - Ron Lancaster
19 - Miles Gorrell
18 - Paul Osbaldiston
18 - Troy Westwood

Touchdowns
Most Touchdowns, career
147 - Milt Stegall (SB)
137 - George Reed (RB)
137 - Mike Pringle (RB)
117 - Allen Pitts (SB)
104 - Geroy Simon (SB)

Most Touchdowns, one season
23 - Milt Stegall (2002)
22 - Cory Philpot (1995)
21 - Allen Pitts (1994)
20 - Pat Abbruzzi (1956)
20 - Darrell K. Smith (1990)
20 - Blake Marshall (1991)
20 - Jon Volpe (1991)

Most Touchdowns, one game
6 - Bob McNamara (October 13, 1956)
6 - Eddie James (September 28, 1932)
5 - Ernie Pitts (August 29, 1959)
5 - Ferd Burket (October 26, 1959)
5 - Earl Lunsford (September 2, 1962)
5 - Martin Patton (August 5, 1995)
5 - Eric Blount (September 15, 1995)

Most Rushing Touchdowns, career
134 - George Reed
125 - Mike Pringle
 93 - Damon Allen
 78 - Normie Kwong
 77 - Matt Dunigan

Most Rushing Touchdowns, one season
19 - Mike Pringle (2000)
18 - Gerry James (1957)
18 - Jim Germany (1981)
18 - Joe Smith (2007)
17 - Pat Abbruzzi (1955)
17 - Pat Abbruzzi (1956)
17 - Larry Key (1981)
17 - Cory Philpot (1995)

Most Rushing Touchdowns, one game
5 - Earl Lunsford (September 2, 1962)
5 - Martin Patton (August 5, 1995)
4 - 22 times, most recently Tommy Stevens (September 10, 2022)

Most Receiving Touchdowns, career
144 - Milt Stegall
117 - Allen Pitts
103 - Geroy Simon
 97 - Brian Kelly
 94 - Arland Bruce

Most Receiving Touchdowns, one season
23 - Milt Stegall (2002)
21 - Allen Pitts (1994)
20 - Darrell K. Smith (1990)
18 - Brian Kelly (1984)
18 - David Williams (1988)
18 - Gerald Alphin (1994)
18 - Chris Armstrong (1994)

Most Receiving Touchdowns, one game
5 - Ernie Pitts (August 29, 1959)
4 - 22 times, most recently Reggie Begelton (August 17, 2019)

Most Punt Return Touchdowns, career
26 - Henry Williams
11 - Earl Winfield
 9 - Keith Stokes
 8 - Michael Clemons
 8 - Jimmy Cunningham
 8 - Bashir Levingston

Most Punt Return Touchdowns, one season
5 - Henry Williams (1991)
5 - Chris Williams (2012)
4 - Henry Williams (1987)
4 - Earl Winfield (1988)
4 - Henry Williams (1993)
4 - Keith Stokes (2004)
4 - Brandon Banks (2015)

Most Punt Return Touchdowns, one game
2 - Ted Toogood (September 16, 1950)
2 - Ron Howell (September 20, 1959)
2 - Henry Williams (June 27, 1987)
2 - Henry Williams (September 6, 1991)
2 - Earl Winfield (September 17, 1993)
2 - Henry Williams (November 7, 1993)
2 - Curtis Mayfield (September 5, 1999)
2 - Keith Stokes (August 2, 2002)
2 - Janarion Grant (August 8, 2019)

Most Kickoff Return Touchdowns, career
5 - Harvey Wylie
3 - Hal Patterson
3 - Larry Highbaugh
3 - Bashir Levingston
3 - Marcus Thigpen

Most Kickoff Return Touchdowns, one season
2 - Eric Blount (1998)
2 - Bashir Levingston (2003)
2 - Tony Miles (2003)
2 - Will Ford (2013)
2 - Kendial Lawrence (2014)
2 - Quincy McDuffie (2016)
2 - Chandler Worthy (2022)
2 - Mario Alford (2022)

Most Kickoff Return Touchdowns, one game
1 - Many

Most Missed Field Goal Return Touchdowns, career
5 - Brandon Banks
4 - Bashir Levingston
3 - Henry Williams
3 - Ezra Landry
3 - Marcus Thigpen

Most Missed Field Goal Return Touchdowns, one season
2 - Keith Stokes (2003)
2 - Ezra Landry (2004)
2 - Bashir Levingston (2004)
2 - Tim Maypray (2010)
2 - Chad Owens (2010)
2 - Marcus Thigpen (2010)
2 - Brandon Banks (2016)
2 - Brandon Banks (2019)

Most Missed Field Goal Return Touchdowns, one game
1 - Many

Most Interception Return Touchdowns, career
9 - Byron Parker
8 - Dick Thornton
8 - Malcolm Frank
8 - Jason Goss
7 - Jovon Johnson

Most Interception Return Touchdowns, one season
5 - Malcolm Frank (2004)
4 - Joe Hollimon (1978)
4 - Byron Parker (2006)
3 - Dick Thornton (1963)
3 - Ed Jones (1980)
3 - Keith Gooch (1989)
3 - William Hampton (1999)
3 - Vernon Mitchell (2000)
3 - Maurice Leggett (2016)

Most Interception Return Touchdowns, one game
3 - Vernon Mitchell (October 7, 2000)
2 - Dick Thornton (August 23, 1963)
2 - Ed Jones (September 7, 1980)
2 - James Jefferson (October 4, 1987)  
2 - Byron Parker (September 4, 2006)
2 - Dexter McCoil (August 23, 2014)
2 - Emanuel Davis (August 9, 2015)

Passing

Most Passing Yards, career
79,816 - Anthony Calvillo
72,381 - Damon Allen
63,227 - Henry Burris
60,736 - Ricky Ray
53,255 - Danny McManus
52,867 - Kevin Glenn
50,535 - Ron Lancaster
43,857 - Matt Dunigan
41,355 - Doug Flutie
40,534 - Tracy Ham

Most Passing Yards, one season
6,619 - Doug Flutie (1991)
6,225 - Kent Austin (1992)
6,092 - Doug Flutie (1993)
6,041 - Anthony Calvillo (2004)
6,023 - David Archer (1993)
5,945 - Doug Flutie (1992)
5,891 - Anthony Calvillo (2003)
5,830 - Michael Reilly (2017)
5,754 - Kent Austin (1993)
5,726 - Doug Flutie (1994)

Most Passing Yards, one game 
713 - Matt Dunigan (for Winnipeg vs Edmonton, July 14, 1994)
601 - Danny Barrett (for B.C. vs Toronto, Aug 12, 1993)
586 - Sam Etcheverry (for Montreal vs Hamilton, Oct 16, 1954)
582 - Doug Flutie (for B.C. vs Edmonton, Oct 12, 1991)
561 - Sam Etcheverry (for Montreal vs Hamilton, Sept 29, 1956)
558 - Kent Austin (for Saskatchewan vs B.C., Aug. 13, 1992 (OT))
556 - Doug Flutie (for Calgary vs Ottawa, Aug 6, 1993)
555 - Warren Moon (for Edmonton vs Montreal, Oct 15, 1983)
553 - Peter Liske (for Calgary vs Saskatchewan, Sept. 29, 1968)
551 - Anthony Calvillo (for Las Vegas vs Ottawa, Sept. 3, 1994)

Most Passing Yards per game, career (minimum 1000 attempts)
306.3 - Doug Flutie
269.8 - Ricky Ray
264.9 - Michael Reilly
262.2 - Jeremiah Masoli
261.0 - Trevor Harris
249.0 - David Archer
243.4 - Kent Austin
242.9 - Bo Levi Mitchell
242.6 - Anthony Calvillo
236.9 - Darian Durant

Most Passing Yards per game, one season
367.7 - Doug Flutie (1991)
360.6 - Matt Dunigan (1994)
356.5 - Kerwin Bell (1998)
353.0 - Warren Moon (1983)
345.8 - Kent Austin (1992)
338.5 - Kent Austin (1993)
338.4 - Doug Flutie (1993)
337.3 - Sam Etcheverry (1956)
335.6 - Anthony Calvillo (2004)
334.9 - Nathan Rourke (2022)

Most Pass Attempts, career
9,437 - Anthony Calvillo
9,138 - Damon Allen
7,426 - Henry Burris
7,301 - Ricky Ray
6,689 - Danny McManus
6,434 - Kevin Glenn
6,233 - Ron Lancaster
5,476 - Matt Dunigan
4,943 - Tracy Ham
4,854 - Doug Flutie

Most Pass Attempts, one season
770 - Kent Austin (1992)
730 - Doug Flutie (1991)
715 - Kent Austin (1993)
715 - Ricky Ray (2005)
703 - Doug Flutie (1993)
701 - David Archer (1993)
690 - Anthony Calvillo (2004)
688 - Doug Flutie (1992)
682 - Anthony Calvillo (2008)
678 - Henry Burris (2015)

Most Pass Attempts, one game
65 - Kent Austin (1991)
64 - Anthony Calvillo (1995)
63 - Doug Flutie (1992)
62 - Joe Adams (1983)
62 - Kent Austin (1992)
62 - Darian Durant (2010)
60 - Kent Austin (1992)
59 - Marcus Crandell 2004
58 - Matt Dunigan (1995)
58 - Dieter Brock (1984)

Most Pass Completions, career
5,892 - Anthony Calvillo
5,158 - Damon Allen
4,976 - Ricky Ray
4,638 - Henry Burris
4,068 - Kevin Glenn
3,640 - Danny McManus
3,384 - Ron Lancaster
3,057 - Matt Dunigan
2,975 - Doug Flutie
2,772 - Michael Reilly

Most Pass Completions, one season
481 - Henry Burris (2015)
479 - Ricky Ray (2005)
474 - Ricky Ray (2017)
472 - Anthony Calvillo (2008)
466 - Doug Flutie (1991)
459 - Kent Austin (1992)
448 - Michael Reilly (2016)
447 - Michael Reilly (2017)
437 - Anthony Calvillo (2005)
434 - Doug Flutie (1996)

Most Pass Completions, one game
45 - Henry Burris (October 1, 2015)
44 - Anthony Calvillo (October 4, 2008)
44 - Trevor Harris (August 11, 2018)
41 - Dieter Brock (October 3, 1981)
41 - Kent Austin (October 31, 1993)
40 - Kent Austin (August 13, 1992)
40 - Ricky Ray (July 24, 2017)
39 - Kent Austin (July 8, 1992)
39 - Khari Jones (September 27, 2002)
39 - Ricky Ray (October 24, 2013)
39 - Trevor Harris (July 8, 2016)
39 - Nathan Rourke (June 25, 2022)
39 - Nathan Rourke (August 13, 2022)

Most consecutive Pass Completions, one game
23 - Jeremiah Masoli (2016)
22 - Jason Maas (2004)
21 - Ricky Ray (2013)
20 - Ricky Ray (2009)
19 - Matt Nichols (2019)
19 - Dane Evans (2019)
18 - Joe Paopao (1979)
18 - Henry Burris (2015)
17 - Mike Rae (1975)
17 - Ricky Ray (2013)
17 - Jake Maier (2021)

Most Passing Touchdowns, career
455 - Anthony Calvillo
394 - Damon Allen
374 - Henry Burris
333 - Ron Lancaster
324 - Ricky Ray
306 - Matt Dunigan
294 - Kevin Glenn
284 - Tracy Ham
270 - Doug Flutie
259 - Danny McManus

Most Passing Touchdowns, one season
48 - Doug Flutie (1994)
47 - Doug Flutie (1997)
46 - Khari Jones (2002)
44 - Doug Flutie (1993)
43 - Anthony Calvillo (2008)
43 - Henry Burris (2012)
39 - Henry Burris (2008)
38 - Tobin Rote (1960)
38 - Doug Flutie (1991)
38 - Henry Burris (2010)

Most Passing Touchdowns, one game
8 - Joe Zuger (1962)
7 - Jim Van Pelt (1959)
7 - Tobin Rote (1960)
7 - Tobin Rote (1960)
7 - Rickey Foggie (1990)
6 - Nine players, most recently by Henry Burris (2015)

Most consecutive regular season games with a Touchdown Pass
34 - Sam Etcheverry (1954–56)
26 - Travis Lulay (2011–12)
23 - Anthony Calvillo (2012–13)
21 - Doug Flutie (1996–97)
21 - Anthony Calvillo (2008–09)
21 - Michael Reilly (2017–18)
19 - Bo Levi Mitchell (2015–16)
18 - Khari Jones (2001–02)
17 - Kent Austin (1993–94)
16 - Doug Flutie (1994–95)
16 - Matt Dunigan (1994–95)

Most Passing Interceptions, career
281 - Danny McManus
278 - Damon Allen
227 - Henry Burris
224 - Anthony Calvillo
214 - Tom Clements
211 - Ron Lancaster
211 - Matt Dunigan
207 - Kevin Glenn
191 - Tom Burgess
191 - Kent Austin

Highest Pass Completion Percentage, career (minimum 1000 attempts)
70.73 - Trevor Harris
70.13 - Cody Fajardo
68.50 - Dane Evans
68.16 - Ricky Ray
67.53 - Dave Dickenson
67.10 - Drew Willy
67.05 - Michael Reilly
66.91 - Zach Collaros
66.84 - McLeod Bethel-Thompson
66.63 - Matt Nichols

Highest Pass Completion Percentage, one season (minimum 250 attempts)
78.70 - Nathan Rourke (2022)
77.23 - Ricky Ray (2013)
74.73 - Jake Maier (2022)
74.50 - Ricky Ray (2016)
73.98 - Dave Dickenson (2005)
73.33 - Trevor Harris (2016)
72.15 - Dane Evans (2019)
72.00 - Anthony Calvillo (2009)
71.76 - Trevor Harris (2019)
71.65 - Trevor Harris (2022)

Highest Pass Completion Percentage, one game (minimum 20 attempts)
95.0 - Ricky Ray (2013) (19/20)
92.0 - Ricky Ray (2008) (23/25)
91.9 - Nathan Rourke (2022) (34/37)
90.9 - Casey Printers (2004) (20/22)
90.9 - Bo Levi Mitchell (2018) (20/22)
90.5 - Tom Wilkinson (1974) (19/21)
90.5 - Danny McManus (1999) (19/21)
90.3 - Trevor Harris (2016) (28/31)
90.0 - Jason Maas (2004) (27/30)
90.0 - Henry Burris (2012) (27/30)

Highest Passer Efficiency Rating, career (minimum 1000 attempts)
110.39 - Dave Dickenson
102.73 - Trevor Harris
100.18 - Zach Collaros
98.44 - Ricky Ray
97.58 - Bo Levi Mitchell
97.13 - Michael Reilly
96.05 - Jeremiah Masoli
95.99 - Dane Evans
95.53 - Anthony Calvillo
94.93 - Jeff Garcia

Highest Passer Efficiency Rating, one season (minimum 250 attempts)
126.37 - Ricky Ray (2013)
123.60 - Nathan Rourke (2022)
118.77 - Dave Dickenson (2005)
116.20 - Zach Collaros (2022)	
115.98 - Trevor Harris (2016)
115.01 - Casey Printers (2004)
114.12 - Dave Dickenson (2000)
113.69 - Zach Collaros (2015)
112.71 - Dave Dickenson (2003)
111.21 - Dave Dickenson (2006)
111.06 - Anthony Calvillo (2000)

Best TD to INT Ratio, one season (minimum 20 TD's)
10.5 - Ricky Ray (2013) (21/2)
6.0 - Dave Dickenson (2000) (36/6)
5.4 - Anthony Calvillo (2000) (27/5)
4.6 - Anthony Calvillo (2010) (32/7)
4.3 - Anthony Calvillo (2009) (26/6)
4.2 - Dave Dickenson (2005) (21/5)
4.0 - Anthony Calvillo (2011) (32/8)
4.0 - Bo Levi Mitchell (2016) (32/8)
3.6 - Jeff Garcia (1995) (25/7)
3.6 - Zach Collaros (2015) (25/7)

Lowest Interception Rate, one season (minimum 250 attempts)
0.66% - Ricky Ray (2013) (303 attempts, 2 interceptions)
1.09% - Anthony Calvillo (2009) (550 attempts, 6 interceptions)
1.14% - Danny Barrett (1991) (438 attempts, 5 interceptions)
1.15% - Anthony Calvillo (2010) (562 attempts, 7 interceptions)
1.21% - Trevor Harris (2016)
1.22% - Dave Dickenson (2000)
1.22% - Anthony Calvillo (2010)
1.24% - Anthony Calvillo (2009)
1.26% - Trevor Harris (2019)
1.28% - Damon Allen (2004)

Highest Touchdown Rate, one season (minimum 250 attempts)
10.33% - Jim Van Pelt (1959) (300 attempts, 31 touchdown passes)
9.30% - Jack Jacobs (1951) (355 attempts, 33 touchdown passes)
8.49% - Zach Collaros (2022) (436 attempts, 37 touchdown passes)
8.44% - Tobin Rote (1960) (450 attempts, 38 touchdown passes)
7.72% - Nathan Rourke (2022)
7.55% - Warren Moon (1980)
7.50% - Sam Etcheverry (1955)
7.42% - Khari Jones (2002)
7.30% - Dave Dickenson (2000)
7.28% - Doug Flutie (1994)

Receiving
Most Receiving Yards, career
16,352 - Geroy Simon
15,153 - Milt Stegall
14,891 - Allen Pitts
14,359 - Darren Flutie
13,778 - Nik Lewis
13,746 - Terry Vaughn
13,301 - Ben Cahoon
13,198 - Ray Elgaard
12,366 - Don Narcisse
12,014 - Derrell Mitchell

Most Receiving Yards, one season
2,036 - Allen Pitts (1994)
2,003 - Terry Greer (1983)
2,000 - Derrell Mitchell (1998)
1,914 - Hal Patterson (1956)
1,862 - Milt Stegall (2002)
1,856 - Geroy Simon (2006)
1,826 - Darrell K. Smith (1990)
1,812 - Brian Kelly (1983)
1,777 - Jamel Richardson (2011)
1,764 - Allen Pitts (1991)

Most Receiving Yards, one game
338 - Hal Patterson (1956)
319 - Curtis Mayfield (1994)
308 - Alfred Jackson (1994)
275 - Terry Vaughn (1999)
275 - Larry Thompson (1995)

Highest Yards Per Catch Average, one season
26.5 - Milt Stegall (1997)
25.0 - Margene Adkins (1969)
24.4 - Jason Tucker (2004)
23.9 - Brian Kelly (1987)
23.4 - Tommy Grant (1964)

Most Pass Receptions, career
1051 - Nik Lewis
1029 - Geroy Simon
1017 - Ben Cahoon
1006 - Terry Vaughn
972 - Darren Flutie

Most Pass Receptions, one season
160 - Derrell Mitchell (1998)
126 - Allen Pitts (1994)
123 - Don Narcisse (1995)
122 - Michael Clemons (1997)
120 - Adarius Bowman (2016)
118 - Allen Pitts (1991)
116 - James Murphy (1986)
116 - Mike Clemons (1996)
116 - Brad Sinopoli (2018)
113 - Terry Greer (1983)

Most Pass Receptions, one game
16 - Terry Greer (1983)
16 - Brian Wiggins (1993)
16 - Derrell Mitchell (1998)
16 - Arland Bruce (2010)
15 - George McGowan (1973)
15 - Eugene Goodlow (1981)
15 - Terry Greer (1982)
15 - Don Narcisse (1993)
15 - Darren Flutie (1997)
15 - Michael Clemons (1997)
15 - Andy Fantuz (2016)

Most 1000+ Pass Receiving Yard Seasons, career
11 - Terry Vaughn
10 - Milt Stegall
10 - Nik Lewis
9 - Ben Cahoon
9 - Allen Pitts
9 - Darren Flutie
9 - Geroy Simon

Rushing
Most Rushing Yards, career
16,425 - Mike Pringle
16,116 - George Reed
11,920 - Damon Allen
10,909 - Johnny Bright
10,285 - Charles Roberts

Most Rushing Yards, one season
2,065 - Mike Pringle (1998)
1,972 - Mike Pringle (1994)
1,896 - Willie Burden (1975)
1,813 - Jon Cornish (2013)
1,794 - Earl Lunsford (1961)

Most Rushing Yards, by a Canadian, one season (all 1000 yard rushers included)
1,813 - Jon Cornish (2013)
1,457 - Jon Cornish (2012)
1,437 - Normie Kwong (1956)
1,390 - Andrew Harris (2018)
1,380 - Andrew Harris (2019)
1,250 - Normie Kwong (1955)
1,205 - Gerry James (1955)
1,198 - Jerome Messam (2016)
1,192 - Gerry James (1957)
1,112 - Andrew Harris (2012)
1,082 - Jon Cornish (2014)
1,075 - Orville Lee (1988)
1,057 - Jerome Messam (2011)
1,054 - Bob Swift (1964)
1,050 - Normie Kwong (1957)
1,039 - Andrew Harris (2015)
1,035 - Andrew Harris (2017)
1,033 - Normie Kwong (1958)
1,020 - Ron Stewart (1960)
1,016 - Jerome Messam (2017)
1,010 - Sean Millington (2000)
1,006 - Jerome Messam (2015)
1,001 – Brady Oliveira (2022)

Most Rushing Yards, by a quarterback, one season
1,086 - Tracy Ham (1990)
1,036 - Damon Allen (1991)
1,006 - Kerry Joseph (2005)
1,005 - Tracy Ham (1989)
998 - Tracy Ham (1991)

Most Rushing Yards, one game
287 - Ron Stewart (1960)
268 - George Reed (1965)
260 - Fred Reid (2009)
249 - Blaise Bryant (1994)
238 - Lovell Coleman (1964)
238 - Willie Burden (1975)

Most Rush Attempts, career
3243 - George Reed
2962 - Mike Pringle
1969 - Johnny Bright
1918 - Charles Roberts
1903 - Andrew Harris

Most Rush Attempts, one season
347 - Mike Pringle (1998)
332 - Willie Burden (1975)
326 - Robert Mimbs (1991)
324 - Troy Davis (2004)
324 - Mike Pringle (2000)

Most Rush Attempts, one game
37 - Doyle Orange (1975)
36 - Lovell Coleman (1963)
34 - George Reed (1970)
34 - George Reed (1975)
34 - Willie Burden (1975)
34 - Blaise Bryant (1994)

Most 1000+ Rushing Yard Seasons, career
11 - George Reed
9 - Mike Pringle
8 - Kelvin Anderson
6 - Charles Roberts
6 - Joffrey Reynolds

Most 100+ Rushing Yard Games, career
70 - Mike Pringle
66 - George Reed
38 - Charles Roberts
36 - Johnny Bright
30 - Dave Thelen

Most 100+ Rushing Yard Games, season
14 - Mike Pringle (1998)
10 - Willie Burden (1975)
10 - Willard Reaves (1984)
10 - Robert Mimbs (1991)
 9 - Six players, six times

Yards from Scrimmage
Most Yards from Scrimmage, career
20,255 - Mike Pringle (16,425 yards rushing, 3,830 yards receiving)
18,888 - George Reed (16,116 yards rushing, 2,772 yards receiving)
16,546 - Geroy Simon (194 yards rushing, 16,352 yards receiving)
15,554 - Andrew Harris (10,151 rushing, 5,403, receiving)
15,208 - Milt Stegall (55 yards rushing, 15,153 yards receiving)

Most Yards from Scrimmage, one season
2,414 - Mike Pringle (1994, 1,972 yards rushing, 442 yards receiving)
2,414 - Mike Pringle (1998, 2,065 yards rushing, 349 yards receiving)
2,207 - Robert Mimbs (1991, 1769 yards rushing, 438 yards receiving)
2,157 - Jon Cornish (2013, 1,813 yards rushing, 344 yards receiving)
2,140 - Willard Reaves (1984, 1,733 yards rushing, 407 yards receiving)

Most Yards from Scrimmage, one game
338 - Hal Patterson (1956, 338 yards receiving)
319 - Dick Smith (1969, 145 yards rushing, 174 yards receiving)
319 - Curtis Mayfield (1994, 319 yards receiving)
308 - Alfred Jackson (1994, 308 yards receiving)
299 - Ed Buchanan (1964, 198 yards rushing, 101 yards receiving)

Interceptions
Most Interceptions, career
87 - Less Browne
66 - Barron Miles
66 - Larry Highbaugh
62 - Terry Irvin
61 - Don Wilson

Most Interceptions, one season
15 - Al Brenner (1972)
14 - Less Browne (1990)
13 - Roy Bennett (1987)
12 - Larry Crawford (1983)
12 - Gerald Bess (1984)
12 - Paul Bennett (1985)
12 - Less Browne (1985)
12 - Terry Irvin (1986)
12 - Rod Hill (1989)
12 - Rod Hill (1990)
12 - Ryan Phillips (2007)

Most Interceptions, one game

5 - Rod Hill (for Winnipeg vs Hamilton, September 9, 1990)
4 - Don Sutherin (for Hamilton vs Edmonton, September 11, 1961) 
4 - Art Johnson (for Toronto vs Montreal, October 7, 1961) 
4 - Peter Ribbins (for Winnipeg vs BC, August 17, 1972) 
4 - Al Brenner (for Hamilton vs Toronto, November 5, 1972)
4 - Chris Sigler (for Montreal vs Ottawa, June 27, 1986)
4 - Less Browne (for Hamilton vs Montreal, August 21, 1986) 
4 - Terry Irvin (for Montreal vs Toronto, November 2, 1986) 
4 - Ed Gainey (for Saskatchewan vs BC, August 13, 2017)

Most Interception Return Yards, career
1,508 - Less Browne
1,178 - Orlondo Steinauer
1,067 - Harry Skipper
1,046 - Don Wilson
1,004 - Paul Bennett

Most Interception Return Yards, one season
348 - Byron Parker (2006)
300 - Robert Grant (2003)
299 - Ryan Phillips (2007)
273 - Less Browne (1990)
267 - Less Browne (1991)

Most Interception Return Yards, one game
172 - Barry Ardern (1969)
144 - Jason Goss (2008)
138 - Jackie Kellogg (2000)
135 - Lewis Cook (1972)
135 - Byron Parker (2006)

Longest Interception Return
120 - Neal Beaumont (1963)
119 - Lewis Porter (1973)
118 - Dickie Harris (1972)
117 - Keon Raymond (2011)
115 - Charlie Brown (1969) 
115 - Eric Harris (1977)
115 - Melvin Byrd (1984)

Quarterback sacks
Most Quarterback Sacks, career
157.0 - Grover Covington
154.0 - Elfrid Payton
142.0 - Bobby Jurasin
139.5 - James Parker
136.0 - Charleston Hughes

Most Quarterback Sacks, one season
26.5 - James Parker (1984)
26.0 - Joe Montford (1999)
25.0 - Grover Covington (1988)
24.0 - Tim Cofield (1995)
23.0 - Gregg Stumon (1987)
23.0 - Cameron Wake (2008)

Most Quarterback Sacks, one game
5.0 - Mack Moore (1982)
5.0 - Rodney Harding (1988)
5.0 - Tim Cofield (1993)
5.0 - Daved Benefield (1995)
5.0 - Tim Cofield (1995)
5.0 - Neal Smith (1999)
5.0 - Elfrid Payton (1999)
5.0 - Duane Butler (2003)
5.0 - Scott Deibert (2003)
5.0 - Tim Gilligan (2004)
5.0 - Anthony Collier (2005)

Tackles (recorded since 1987)
Most Defensive Tackles, career
1241 - Willie Pless
1151 - Mike O'Shea
1095 - Alondra Johnson
979 - Chip Cox
955 - Barrin Simpson

Most Defensive Tackles, one season
144 - Solomon Elimimian (2017)
143 - Solomon Elimimian (2014)
130 - J. C. Sherritt (2012)
129 - Solomon Elimimian (2016)
127 - Bruce Holmes (1990)

Most Defensive Tackles, one game
17 - Simoni Lawrence (Sept 27, 2019)
16 - Reggie Hunt (July 10, 2003)
15 - Calvin Tiggle (Aug 19, 1999)
15 - Solomon Elimimian (July 6, 2017)
14 - Bruce Holmes (Oct 15, 1989)
14 - Jeff Braswell (Oct 31, 1992)
14 - Markeith Knowlton (June 26, 2008)
14 - Barrin Simpson (July 24, 2009)
14 - Ian Wild (Aug 22, 2014)
14 - Solomon Elimimian (Aug 31, 2016)
14 - Avery Williams (Aug 7, 2021)

Most Tackles for a Loss, one game
6 - K. D. Williams, 19 yards (1995)
4 - Brian Hilk, 12 yards (1991)
3 - Stewart Hill, 22 yards (1991)

Most Special Teams Tackles, career
226 - Mike Miller
190 - Jason Arakgi
184 - Wade Miller
176 - Brendan Rogers
176 - Sean Millington

Most Special Teams Tackles, one season
37 - Wade Miller (1994)
37 - Dylan Barker (2009)
35 - Donovan Gans (1995)
35 - Wade Miller (1997)  
35 - Mike Maurer (2001)
35 - Rocky Henry (1999)
35 - Jason Arakgi (2009)

Most Special Teams Tackles, one game
7 - Paul Clatney (July 11, 1991)
7 - Terry Wright (Sept 14, 1991)
7 - Brendan Rogers (Sept 23, 1994)
7 - Norman Bradford (Sept 10, 1995)
7 - Donovan Gans (Sept 24, 1995)
7 - Darren Joseph (Oct 13, 2003)
7 - Mike Miller (July 5, 2019)

Blocked Kicks
Most Blocked Kicks, career
13 - Barron Miles
12 - Gerald Vaughn
 8 - Rod Hill
 8 - Less Browne
 7 - James Zachery
 7 - Scott Flagel

Most Blocked Kicks, one season
5 - James Zachery (1986)
4 - Matt Goodwin (1994)
4 - Gerald Vaughn (2000)
3 - Several players (Most recently Scott Gordon in 2005)

Most Blocked Kicks, one game
2 - Ken Lehmann (Aug 23, 1967)
2 - Allen Ray Aldridge (Aug 25, 1968)
2 - John Vilunas (Sept 23, 1970)
2 - Donnie Thomas (Aug 30, 1970)
2 - Dave Chaytors (Oct 17, 1999)
2 - Markus Howell (Aug 10, 2000)
2 - Daved Benefield (Aug 17, 2000)
2 - Gerald Vaughn (Oct 8, 2001)
2 - Donnovan Carter (Oct 26, 2002)

Punting
Most Punting Yards, career
134,301 - Bob Cameron
133,826 - Lui Passaglia
92,281 - Hank Ilesic
89,093 - Paul Osbaldiston
87,629 - Terry Baker

Most Punting Yards, one season
8,214 - Bob Cameron (1988)
8,004 - Hank Ilesic (1986)
7,425 - Bob Cameron (1989)
7,307 - Ken Clark (1986)
7,302 - Bernie Ruoff (1957)

Most Punting Yards, one game
814 - Martin Fabi (1963)
785 - Cam Fraser (1958)
781 - Cam Fraser (1954)
744 - Noel Prefontaine (2004)

Most Punts, career
3142 - Lui Passaglia
3129 - Bob Cameron
2142 - Paul Osbaldiston
2062 - Hank Ilesic
2031 - Terry Baker
2031 - Paul McCallum

Most Punts, one season
188 - Bob Cameron (1988)
175 - Bob Cameron (1989)
168 - Ken Clark (1987)
168 - Tom Dixon (1988)
165 - Hank Ilesic (1986)
165 - Bob Cameron (1987)
165 - Glenn Harper (1988)

Most Punts, one game
18 - Martin Fabi (1963)
17 - Larry Isbell (1955)
17 - Cam Fraser (1955)
16 - Avatus Stone (1954)
16 - Avatus Stone (1954)
16 - Ronnie Quillian (1957)
16 - Roger Kettlewell (1969)
16 - Troy Westwood (2003)
16 - Noel Prefontaine (2004)

Highest Punting Average, career (minimum 500 attempts)
47.7 - Richie Leone
45.8 - Damon Duval
45.7 - Burke Dales
45.7 - Noel Prefontaine
45.6 - Ken Clark

Highest Punting Average, season (minimum 90 attempts)
50.6 - Jon Ryan (2005)
50.2 - Lui Passaglia (1983)
49.5 - Richie Leone (2015)
49.2 - Richie Leone (2016)
48.8 - Jon Ryan (2019) 

Highest Punting Average, one game (minimum 4 Punts)
64.7 - Nick Setta (2008)
64.3 - Cody Grace (2022)
63.5 - Paul Osbaldiston (2002)
62.4 - Richie Leone (2016)
60.2 - Ken Clark (1983)

Longest Punt
108 yards - Zenon Andrusyshyn, (October 23, 1977 at Clarke Stadium)
108 yards - Christopher Milo, (October 29, 2011 at Mosaic Stadium)
102 yards - Dave Mann,(September 18, 1966 at Taylor Field)
101 yards - Dean Dorsey, (October 11, 1982 at Winnipeg Stadium)
101 yards - Ken Clark, (September 3, 1983 at Taylor Field)

Field Goals
Most Field Goals, career
875 - Lui Passaglia
722 - Paul McCallum
673 - Mark McLoughlin
669 - Paul Osbaldiston
617 - Troy Westwood

Most Field Goals, season
60 - Justin Medlock (2016)
59 - Dave Ridgway (1990)
57 - Carlos Huerta (1995)
56 - Roman Anderson (1995)
56 - Sandro DeAngelis (2006)
56 - Rene Paredes (2016)
56 - Justin Medlock (2017)

Most Field Goals 50+ yards, season
8 - J. T. Hay (1986)
8 - Carlos Huerta (1994)
7 - Lirim Hajrullahu (2018)
7 - Brett Maher (2016)

Most Field Goals, game
8 - Dave Ridgway (1984)
8 - Dave Ridgway (1988)
8 - Mark McLoughlin (1996)
8 - Paul Osbaldiston (1996)
7 - 21 players (Most recently Sean Whyte on August 23, 2019)

Most Field Goals 50+ yards, game
3 - Justin Medlock (Aug 14, 2009)
2 - Many (Most recently Boris Bede on October 30, 2021)

Highest Field Goal Accuracy, career (minimum 100 attempts)
88.72% - Lewis Ward
87.59% - Rene Paredes
87.08% - Sean Whyte
86.47% - Justin Medlock
85.52% - Sergio Castillo
84.17% - Tyler Crapigna
83.17% - Brett Lauther
83.29% - Lirim Hajrullahu
81.87% - Sandro DeAngelis
81.85% - Boris Bede

Highest Field Goal Accuracy, season (minimum 30 attempts)
98.07% - Lewis Ward (2018)
94.74% - Rene Paredes (2013)
94.34% - Paul McCallum (2011)
93.75% - Sean Whyte (2016)
93.02% - Rene Paredes (2012)
92.31% - Sean Whyte (2022)
91.67% - Rene Paredes (2021)
91.38% - Rene Paredes (2017)
91.11% - Rene Paredes (2018)
91.11% - Sergio Castillo (2019)

Longest Field Goal
62 yards - Paul McCallum, (October 27, 2001 at Taylor Field)
60 yards - Dave Ridgway, (September 6, 1987 at Taylor Field)
59 yards - Dave Cutler, (October 28, 1970 at Taylor Field)
59 yards - Paul Watson, (July 12, 1981 at Taylor Field)
58 yards - eight players (Most recently Brett Maher on October 1, 2016 at Tim Hortons Field)

Consecutive Field Goals
69 - Lewis Ward (2018–19)
39 - Rene Paredes (2012–13)
32 - Rene Paredes (2016)
30 - Paul McCallum (2011)
30 - Rene Paredes (2021–22)
28 - Dave Ridgway (1993)
28 - Christopher Milo (2013)
28 - Justin Medlock (2016–17)
25 - Sean Whyte (2016–17)
25 - Sean Whyte (2019)

Punt Returns
Most Punt Returns, career
1003 - Henry Williams
659 - Paul Bennett
610 - Michael Clemons
516 - Marvin Coleman
469 - Jason Armstead

Most Punt Returns, one season
123 - Jim Silye (1970)
118 - Anthony Hunter (1989)
112 - Rudy Linterman (1968)
111 - Darnell Clash (1985)
111 - Michael Clemons (1997)

Most Punt Returns, one game
14 - Rudy Linterman (1968)
14 - Will Lewis (1987)

Most Punt Return Yards, career
11,257 - Henry Williams
6,358 - Paul Bennett
6,025 - Michael Clemons
5,211 - Marvin Coleman
4,746 - Stefan Logan

Most Punt Return Yards, one season
1,440 - Henry Williams (1991)
1,236 - Rudy Linterman (1995)
1,200 - Roy Finch (2017)
1,181 - Anthony Hunter (1989)
1,162 - Stefan Logan (2016)

Most Punt Return Yards, one game
232 - Henry Williams (1991)
224 - Keith Stokes (2002)
222 - Janarion Grant (2019)
221 - Henry Williams (1987)

Longest Punt Return
113 - Sam Rogers (1995)
109 - Herb Johnson (1953)
109 - Parnell Moore (1988)
109 - Bashir Levingston (2005)

Kick Returns
Most Kickoff Returns, career
335 - Henry Williams
309 - Chris Rainey
303 - Stefan Logan
300 - Michael Clemons
292 - Jason Armstead

Most Kickoff Returns, one season
76 - Stefan Logan (2017)
74 - Ian Smart (2008)
72 - Chris Rainey (2017)
71 - Chad Owens (2012)
69 - Chad Owens (2011)

Most Kickoff Returns, one game
9 - Anthony Cherry (1989)
9 - Lee Hull (1990)
9 - Lorenzo Graham (1990)
9 - Freeman Baysinger (1994)
9 - Albert Johnson III (2000)
9 - Ian Smart (2008)
9 - Ian Smart (2009)
9 - Jovon Johnson (2009)
9 - Larry Taylor (2009)
9 - Brandon West (2011)

Most Kickoff Return Yards, career
7,354 - Henry Williams
7,185 - Chris Rainey
6,683 - Stefan Logan
6,478 - Tristan Jackson
6,349 - Michael Clemons

Most Kickoff Return Yards, one season
1,805 - Ian Smart (2008)
1,750 - Chad Owens (2011)
1,695 - Eric Blount (1998)
1,671 - Chris Rainey (2017)
1,651 - Stefan Logan (2017)

Most Kickoff Return Yards, one game
257 - Anthony Cherry (1989)
245 - Chad Owens (2011)
239 - Joe Hollimon (1976)
231 - Brandon West (2011)
228 - Stephen Jones (1986)

Longest Kickoff Return
120 - Mack Herron (1972)
118 - Larry Highbaugh (1976)
115 - Bobby Thompson (1971)
113 - Sammy Greene (1983)
112 - Dave West (1952)
110 - Ryan Christian (2010)

Missed Field Goal Returns
Most Missed Field Goal Returns, career
59 - Henry Williams
35 - Keith Stokes

Most Missed Field Goal Returns, season
11 - Joe Fuller (1987)
11 - Rashid Gayle (1999)

Most Missed Field Goal Return Yards, season
506 - Keith Stokes (2003)
425 - Chad Owens (2010)
384 - Marcus Thigpen (2010)

Longest Missed Field Goal Return
131 - Boyd Carter/Dave Mann (1958) (Carter for 15 yards, then lateral to Mann for 116 yards and TD)
130 - Ken Hinton (1977)
129 - Bashir Levingston (2007)
129 - Dominique Dorsey (2009)
129 - Tristan Jackson (2012)
129 - Trent Guy (2012)

Grey Cup records
Grey Cup championship won, as a player:
7 - Bill Stevenson, Hank Ilesic

Grey Cup games played in:
9 - Mel Wilson, John Barrow, Tommy Grant, Angelo Mosca, Dave Cutler, Larry Highbaugh, Hank Ilesic

Most Passing Yards, Grey Cup games
2,470 - Anthony Calvillo
1,512 - Ricky Ray
1,431 - Bo Levi Mitchell
1,420 - Doug Flutie
1,357 - Danny McManus
1,304 - Bernie Faloney
1,281 - Henry Burris
1,224 - Sam Etcheverry
1,154 - Damon Allen
1,026 - Ron Lancaster

Most Receiving Yards, Grey Cup games
658 - Ben Cahoon
575 - Hal Patterson
465 - John Patterson
402 - Tom Scott
394 - Brian Kelly
364 - Allen Pitts
361 - Ernie Pitts
360 - Andy Fantuz
345 - Jamel Richardson
318 - Rick House

Most Rushing Yards, Grey Cup games
391 - Mike Pringle
356 - Leo Lewis
346 - George Reed
332 - Normie Kwong
312 - Robert Drummond
275 - Jackie Parker
263 - Jim Germany
261 - Johnny Bright
232 - Gerry McDougall
232 - Wes Cates

Most Defensive Tackles, Grey Cup games
48 - John Barrow 
42 - Dan Kepley
34 - Juan Sheridan
32 - Dale Potter
30 - Dale Scott
29 - Angelo Mosca
26 - Herb Gray
26 - Garney Henley
24 - Ron Estay
24 - Ed Jones

See also
List of Canadian Football League annual passing leaders
List of Canadian Football League annual receiving leaders
List of Canadian Football League annual rushing leaders
List of Canadian Football League players with 1,000 rushing yards in a season

References

2021 CFL Guide & Record Book

Records
Sports competition records